The Valjala Stronghold was a major ringfort on the island of Saaremaa in Estonia. Established in the 12th century, at the time it was the most important Oeselian stronghold. Its surrender in 1227 finalized the crusader conquest of Estonia.

History

The Valjala Stronghold was founded in the 12th century, and by the time of the crusades had become the main fortress of the island of Saaremaa. The nearby Lõve River was an actively used waterway for the Oeselians.

Henry of Livonia referred to the leaders of Valjala as nobiles, a term usually reserved for the Western European nobility. He also stressed the stronghold's importance, describing it as follows:

In January 1227 the Livonian Brothers of the Sword organized a major invasion against Saaremaa, marching an army of 20,000 men over the frozen sea. The stronghold of Muhu was attacked first and completely destroyed. The crusader army then laid siege to Valjala, plundering the island in the process. The defenders of the Valjala Stronghold surrendered and accepted Christianity. This surrender concluded the crusaders’ conquest of Estonia.

Excavation results, including finds of iron nails, indicate that the stronghold remained in use after the crusade. It was probably demolished, possibly after failed rebellions of 1236–1241 or 1260–1261.

Excavations

The stronghold ruins were first excavated in 1895 by Sergei Bogojavlenski and P. P. Stackelberg. Between 1962 and 1964 a team led by Aita Kustin conducted excavations, discovering multiple building foundations and stove floors. Archaeological finds from the stronghold included crusader crossbow bolts from the 1227 siege.

Today
The height of the walls is  inside and  outside. The courtyard includes a limestone-lined well.

See also 
Varbola Stronghold
Ancient Estonia

References

Bibliography

Livonian Crusade
Castles in Estonia
Saaremaa Parish
Buildings and structures in Saaremaa
Ruined castles in Estonia
Tourist attractions in Saare County
Buildings and structures completed in the 12th century